FBS Radio Network is a  Philippine broadcasting company. Its corporate office is located at Unit 908, Paragon Plaza, EDSA cor. Reliance St., Mandaluyong.

History
Leonida "Nida" Laki-Vera and her husband Luis Vera began their broadcast business as the Freedom Broadcasting System (FBS) in the 1970s. FBS launched its first station DWBL. A year later, FBS established its FM station DWLL, which is later on known as Mellow Touch. Radio personalities such as Butch Gonzales, Rudolph Rivera, and newscaster Ernie Fresnido worked for DWBL and Mellow Touch throughout the late 70s.

As time passed by towards the 1990s, the couple transferred the ownership of FBS to their children, namely Luis Jr. ("Luigi") and Lena. To coincide their business, the network dropped its legal name and became FBS Radio Network. Under the new owners, FBS expanded the Mellow Touch network in key provincial cities.

In 2004, FBS sold its two respective stations DWKT (Dagupan) and DYLL (Cebu) to Ultrasonic Broadcasting System. In return, UBSI sold its AM station DWSS to FBS.

FBS Radio Stations

AM stations

FM stations

References

 
Philippine radio networks
Companies based in Mandaluyong